Elachista veruta is a moth of the family Elachistidae. It is found in the United Arab Emirates.

References

veruta
Moths described in 2008
Endemic fauna of the United Arab Emirates
Moths of Asia